Bolhur (also Romanized as Bolhūr; also known as Bolhar) is a village in Garmsir Rural District, in the Central District of Ardestan County, Isfahan Province, Iran. At the 2006 census, its population was 10, in 4 families.

References 

Populated places in Ardestan County